George Montagu (1713–1780) was an English politician who sat in the House of Commons. He is known for his correspondence with Horace Walpole.

According to the Walpole scholar Wilmarth Sheldon Lewis (1895–1979), Walpole's letters to Montagu are ".. of more general interest than are those written to any other correspondent ...".

George Montagu was the eldest son of Brigadier Edward Montagu. George became a friend of Horace Walpole when they attended Eton and their friendship lasted until about 1770. According to Walpole, their friendship ended partly because of political differences and partly because of Montagu's caprice.

Montagu was Ranger of Selwyn Forest. He was Usher of the Black Rod in Ireland from 1761 to 1763 during the Viceroyalty of his cousin, the 2nd Earl of Halifax. George Montagu was also Private Secretary to Lord North, when the latter was Chancellor of the Exchequer.

Montagu was elected Member of Parliament for Northampton.

References

1713 births
1780 deaths
People educated at Eton College
Members of the Parliament of Great Britain for English constituencies